Taxiphyllum barbieri, known as Java moss or Bogor moss, is a moss belonging to the family Hypnaceae. Native to southeast Asia, it is commonly used in freshwater aquariums. It attaches to rocks, roots, and driftwood. In the wild, it grows in humid riparian areas.

It was originally described as Isopterygium barbieri from Vinh, Vietnam.

Description
The species is dioecious and perennial. It forms loose cushions of irregularly arranged branches. Leaves are two ranked and flat. It has only been recorded in the wild in Vietnam.

Cultivation and uses
In the aquarium trade, Java moss can refer to either Taxiphyllum barbieri  or Vesicularia dubyana, and it can be difficult to distinguish between the species. T. barbieri  was first introduced to European aquarists in 1968, where it was initially misidentified as Glossadelphus zollingeri.

T. barbieri is one of the most common mosses in the aquarium trade. It does not require any special attention and propagates readily. It accepts all kinds of water, even weakly brackish, and all kinds of light qualities. It makes a good foreground plant. Due to its clinging nature, Java moss can also be made into a moss carpet.

It is especially popular among aquarists raising fry (baby fish) and tadpoles, to protect them from cannibalistic adults. Some shrimp like to feed on the various microorganisms and detritus that collect on the moss.

Java moss can be easily propagated via division. It is suitable for both aquatic and terrestrial cultivation in vivariums. Spore capsules are rarely formed in cultivation.

See also 
 Vesicularia montagnei, also known as "Christmas moss" or "Brazil moss"

References

External links 
 The Aquarium Wiki article on caring for Java Moss in the aquarium

Hypnaceae
Freshwater plants